Mousa Esmaeilpour Karimi is an Iranian professional bodybuilder and coach. He participated in different IFBB Competitions and he won different medals. He is currently the coach of Iran's national bodybuilding team and has won many honors.

Life and career 
Mousa Esmaeilpour was born on September 21, 1981, in Babol, Iran. Mousa turned into wrestling sport due to personal and family interesting in 1996 and he also participated in national competitions and he has won numerous awards. But he left wrestling sport due to injuries after four years.

He started bodybuilding as a professional athlete after one year of his injuries in 2001 where there was no longer able to continue wrestling. Mousa began his exercises and work hard at the gym. After a while he won the first place at the national bodybuilding competition in 2003. Then he moved to Dubai in 2004 where he continued his fitness training.

Mousa didn't participate any competition a few years, but he participated at the Asian competitions in 2010 and then he won the Asian championship and he got the most beautiful good shaped body certificate, IFBB certificate and also honorary Jay Cutler's certificate. After that he came back to Iran and started again his activities.

Mousa Esmaeilpour went away from his fitness exercises again, but he prepared himself for International Indian bodybuilding competition in 2014. But this time he prepared himself for the Physique fitness competition with hard working and heavy exercises. Mousa has won the 2nd place in Indian competition for the first time as an Iranian athlete. He got WBPF coach certificate. He worked out with heavy exercises again and he participated at IFBB Dubai Muscle Show 2016 and he awarded Gold Medal and took the first place in Physique sports championship. 

Fitness is an essential part of a healthy lifestyle. It helps us maintain physical and mental health, prevents chronic diseases, and improves overall well-being. However, getting started with fitness can be overwhelming, especially if you don't know where to begin. In this article, we'll discuss some simple fitness tips that can help you kickstart your fitness journey and stay on track.

Titles and honors

References

External links 
 Mousa Esmaeilpour's Official Website

Living people
Iranian bodybuilders
Professional bodybuilders
Year of birth missing (living people)